Welshpool Road is a major arterial road running through the metropolitan area of Perth, Western Australia. Although the road is now split in two, having had its western and eastern sections disconnected due to the extension of Roe Highway, it remains Welshpool's second most important road (after Orrong Road), and the highest quality access road for the Darling Scarp.

Welshpool Road East is part of  State Route 8, while the entire road was previously allocated  State Route 35.

Route description

Welshpool Road
The road is typical of those major in the Welshpool Area; although of a reasonable quality, being a 4-lane single or dual carriageway it contains only a handful of traffic lights, is choked by traffic in peak hour, has industrial business dotting the road, and has many minor roads which have no form of control, give way and stop signs excepted.

Welshpool Road begins as an extension of a west-east section of Albany Highway (Albany Highway continues to the south of the intersection). Continuing through Welshpool, it meets Leach Highway soon after. Leach Highway marks the most dangerous intersection for both Welshpool Road and Leach Highway; the intersection is also one of Perth's busiest. It then meets Kewdale Road, passing through outer Welshpool after this point. The final controlled intersection for the road is McDowell Street. McDowell Street extends north, meets Orrong Road, and then continues into neighbouring Kewdale. Although of importance for barely , McDowell Street distributes traffic onto Orrong Road, allowing motorists to continue their journey along Welshpool Road East.

For those who continue along Welshpool Road, the road sharply turns south after , and continues as William Street.

Junctions

Welshpool Road East
Welshpool Road East (9.5 km long) had an East suffix added after the road's disconnection. At a similar quality to Welshpool Road, its 4-lane section is an entire dual carriageway; it changes to a 2 to 3 lane single carriageway after climbing most of the Darling Scarp, however. With only 4 traffic lights in total (two of those at Roe Highway's diamond interchange), traffic problems are relatively minor, the only congestion being towards Roe Highway westbound.

Allocated State Route 8, Welshpool Road East starts as an extension of Orrong Road. Soon after meeting Roe Highway, it meets Hale Road. Hale Road serves as the main road for Forrestfield, eventually passing through a rural Maida Vale and climbing the Darling Scarp. Welshpool Road then passes through Wattle Grove, a mostly rural foothill suburb; however, this section is suburban. It then meets Tonkin Highway; this marks both State Route 8 and Welshpool Road's final traffic light and departure from the Swan Coastal Plain.

After this point, the scenery transitions to semi-rural; however, the quality of the road remains high. A short time after this, the median which was previously as wide as 4 lanes thins out dramatically, and becomes negligible. The road continues to climb quite steeply; similar to Great Eastern Highway the climb is constant; Kalamunda Road's climb of the escarpment is undulating. Welshpool Road East then meets Lesmurdie Road, and finally changes to a 2-lane single carriageway. After this point, westbound traffic is given two overtaking lanes that last for about  each. Finishing its climb in Carmel, Welshpool Road terminates into Canning Road.

Junctions

History

Roe Highway's extension beyond Welshpool Road in 2002 represented the biggest change to Perth's transport infrastructure since the Graham Farmer Freeway was opened in 2000. Welshpool Road, Orrong Road and William Street were the 3 major roads affected due to the extension.

Before Roe Highway's extension in 2002, the highway's north and southbound lanes separated, leaving a  gap between them once they met Welshpool Road. After this, they both formed one lane and came back together, continuing as William Street. Orrong Road would terminate into Welshpool Road in the form of a T-junction.

Due to the extension of Roe Highway, major changes were made. Firstly, Welshpool Road was disconnected; William Street was disconnected from Roe Highway, and Orrong Road was extended to meet Roe Highway in the form of a diamond interchange. Orrong Road now continues as Welshpool Road East. Welshpool Road West now continues as William Street.

Notes

References

Skyview WA - Department of Land Information, Western Australia
UBD Street Directory - 46th & 49th Editions
Main Roads WA

Roads in Perth, Western Australia